Eira Aune (born 10 March 1997) is a Norwegian handball player for Silkeborg-Voel KFUM and Norwegian national recruit team.

On 25 April 2020, Aune signed a 2-year contract with Silkeborg-Voel KFUM in the Danish Women's Handball League. In October 2021, she extended her contract with the club until the summer of 2024.

She was called up for the Norwegian national recruit team in April 2022, for training camp in Oslo.

Individual awards
 Player of the Month (January) in the Damehåndboldligaen: 2021/2022

References

1997 births
Living people
Norwegian female handball players
People from Lillestrøm
Sportspeople from Viken (county)